In statistics, the method of moments is a method of estimation of population parameters. The same principle is used to derive higher moments like skewness and kurtosis.

It starts by expressing the population moments (i.e., the expected values of powers of the random variable under consideration) as functions of the parameters of interest. Those expressions are then set equal to the sample moments. The number of such equations is the same as the number of parameters to be estimated. Those equations are then solved for the parameters of interest. The solutions are estimates of those parameters.  

The method of moments was introduced by Pafnuty Chebyshev in 1887 in the proof of the central limit theorem. The idea of matching empirical moments of a distribution to the population moments dates back at least to Pearson.

Method
Suppose that the problem is to estimate  unknown parameters  characterizing the distribution  of the random variable . Suppose the first  moments of the true distribution (the "population moments") can be expressed as functions of the  s:

 

Suppose a sample of size  is drawn, resulting in the values . For , let 
 

Advantages and disadvantages
The method of moments is fairly simple and yields consistent estimators (under very weak assumptions), though these estimators are often biased.

It is an alternative to the method of maximum likelihood.

However, in some cases the likelihood equations may be intractable without computers, whereas the method-of-moments estimators can be computed much more quickly and easily. Due to easy computability, method-of-moments estimates may be used as the first approximation to the solutions of the likelihood equations, and successive improved approximations may then be found by the Newton–Raphson method.  In this way the method of moments can assist in finding maximum likelihood estimates.

In some cases, infrequent with large samples but less infrequent with small samples, the estimates given by the method of moments are outside of the parameter space (as shown in the example below); it does not make sense to rely on them then.  That problem never arises in the method of maximum likelihood.  Also, estimates by the method of moments are not necessarily sufficient statistics, i.e., they sometimes fail to take into account all relevant information in the sample.

When estimating other structural parameters (e.g., parameters of a utility function, instead of parameters of a known probability distribution), appropriate probability distributions may not be known, and moment-based estimates may be preferred to maximum likelihood estimation.

Examples
An example application of the method of moments is to estimate polynomial probability density distributions. In this case, an approximate polynomial of order  is defined on an interval . The  method of moments then yields a system of equations, whose solution involves the inversion of a Hankel matrix.

Proving the central limit theorem 
Let  be independent random variables with mean 0 and variance 1, then let . At the  limit, all moments converge to that of a standard normal distribution. More analysis then show that this convergence in moments imply a convergence in distribution. 

Essentially this argument was published by Chebyshev in 1887.

Uniform distribution 
Consider the uniform distribution on the interval , . If  then we have

 

 

Solving these equations gives

 

 

Note, however, that this method can produce inconsistent results in some cases.

See also
 Generalized method of moments
Decoding methods

References

Probability distribution fitting
Moment (mathematics)